Lodge Rock is a low, snow-capped rock, less than  high, between Barn Rock and Hayrick Island in the Terra Firma Islands, off the west coast of Graham Land, Antarctica. The Terra Firma Islands were first visited and surveyed in 1936 by the British Graham Land Expedition under John Rymill. This rock was surveyed in 1948 by the Falkland Islands Dependencies Survey, and so named by them because a low ledge onto which sledges could be driven provided lodgment clear of the sea ice pressure area.

References

Rock formations of Graham Land
Fallières Coast